Esther Edwards can refer to:
Esther Edwards Burr (1732–1758), wife of Aaron Burr, Sr. and mother of Aaron Burr, Jr.
Esther Edwards Conner (1875–1943), mother of Bolivar Edwards Kemp, Jr.
Esther Gordy Edwards (1920–2011), American businesswoman